The Golden Ring, also called Zachar Berkut, is an opera in four acts and nine scenes by the Ukrainian composer Borys Lyatoshynsky. The libretto was written by the poet , and was based on Zachar Berkut, a short story by the Ukrainian writer Ivan Franko. The work was premiered in Odessa on 26 March, 1930. Written in 1929, it was the earliest music-drama in Ukrainian.

References

Sources

Further reading

External links
 Myroslava’s aria– score and parts from Lviv National Opera

1930 operas
Operas
Ukrainian-language operas
Compositions by Borys Lyatoshynsky